Line 8 of the Hangzhou Metro is a metro line in Hangzhou. The line is 17.17 km long and will run in a west–east direction between South Wenhai Road station and Xinwan Road station in Qiantang District. The line was opened on 28 June 2021.

Stations

See also
 Hangzhou Metro

References

08
Railway lines opened in 2021
2021 establishments in China
Standard gauge railways in China